The 2012 Caerphilly Council election took place on 3 May 2012 to elect members of Caerphilly County Borough Council in Wales. This was on the same day as other Welsh local elections.

Election results
The Labour Party won control of the council from Plaid Cymru, after gaining an additional 18 seats. Four council candidates were elected unopposed.

Among the notable Plaid Cymru defeated councillors were the current mayor, Vera Jenkins (Crumlin ward) and Ron Davies, the ex-Labour Secretary of State for Wales (Bedwas, Trethomas and Machen ward).

|}

References

2012 Welsh local elections
2012